Bury is a municipality in Le Haut-Saint-François Regional County Municipality in the Estrie region of Quebec, Canada.

Bury is home to a Canada Day celebration which is well known in the Estrie region and which draws in triple the town's population for a parade and events in the park. Bury, although it has no restaurants or cinemas, has a multitude of churches and one canteen.

About 48% of Bury's population are bilingual (English and French), 39% only speaks French and 13% only speaks English.

In 1981, Mrs. Isabel Harrison of Bury was chosen by the Royal Canadian Legion as the Silver Cross Mother.  Each year, a mother is invited to lay a wreath during the Remembrance Day ceremony at the National War Memorial in Ottawa on behalf of all mothers who have lost children in the service of their country.  Widows and survivors of Canadian Forces' casualties are eligible to receive and wear the Memorial Cross.

Climate

References

External links

Municipalities in Quebec
Incorporated places in Estrie
Le Haut-Saint-François Regional County Municipality